Nathan Evans (born 19 December 1994) is a Scottish singer from Airdrie, Scotland best known for singing sea shanties. Evans first gained fame in 2020 by posting videos of himself singing sea shanties on social media service TikTok. In 2021, he released a cover of the folk song "Wellerman" which peaked at the top of the UK Singles Chart and also charted in several other countries.

Early life
Before launching his music career, Evans was a postal worker with the Royal Mail, in Airdrie, near Glasgow. He attended Caldervale High School and has a university degree in web design.

Music career 
Evans had been posting performances of pop and folk songs to TikTok before beginning to post sea shanties. He posted his first traditional sea shanty, "Leave Her Johnny", to TikTok in July 2020. In the following months, viewers of his videos continued to request more sea shanties, leading Evans to posting videos of himself singing "The Scotsman" and New Zealand 19th-century maritime song "Wellerman" in December 2020.

"Wellerman", which was already well known on the app due to the popularity of his version of the song, quickly gained views on TikTok, inspiring many others to record more sea shanties, to duet and to remix the song, including renditions by composer Andrew Lloyd Webber, comedians Jimmy Fallon and Stephen Colbert, guitarist Brian May, and entrepreneur Elon Musk. As of January 2021, "Wellerman" had eight million views on TikTok and as of 29 May, Evans had 1.3 million followers. The sea shanties trend on the app has been called "ShantyTok". In the Rolling Stone article discussing his success, Evans cited The Albany Shantymen version of the song as inspiration.

In January 2021, Evans signed a three-single recording contract with Polydor Records, releasing his official version of "Wellerman" on 22 January 2021. A dance remix of the song created with producers 220 Kid and duo Billen Ted was released simultaneously. His growing music career led him to quit his job as a postal worker. In February 2021, he signed to United Talent Agency. In May 2021, Evans played his first live show. The performance took place in London aboard an electric GoBoat in the River Thames as a promotion for GoBoat's new location at Canary Wharf.

Writing about the nature of Evans's success during the time of the COVID-19 pandemic, Amanda Petrusich wrote in The New Yorker: "It seems possible that after nearly a year of solitude and collective self-banishment, and of crushing restrictions on travel and adventure, the chantey might be providing a brief glimpse into a different, more exciting way of life, a world of sea air and pirates and grog."

Evans's second single, "Told You So", released on 25 June 2021. Like with "Wellerman", two versions were released: a folk-pop version and a dance-pop remix by Digital Farm Animals. Evans released his third single, "Ring Ding (A Scotsman's Story)", on 8 October 2021. 

In April 2022, Evans helped publicise the Doctor Who story "Legend of the Sea Devils" with an adaptation of "Wellerman". 

Evans planned to release a five-song EP of sea shanties in 2021. However, in November 2022, Evans released his first full-length album, titled Wellerman – The Album, which is largely a collection of sea shanties, including his viral 2021 cover of "Wellerman" and its dance remix. The album also includes Evans's original composition "Haul Away".

Music style
Evans is a singer-songwriter, often using multiple tracks of his own voice. He accompanies himself with guitar and percussion. He sings in a baritone.

Other work
In January 2022, Evans appeared as himself in the fourth episode of the seventh series of the Scottish mockumentary series Scot Squad. In November 2022, he appeared as a racer at the World Wok Racing Championship, televised in Germany as a special episode of TV Total, representing Scotland.

Publications 
In May 2021, it was announced that Evans will be publishing a collection of Sea Shanties titled The Book of Sea Shanties: Wellerman and Other Songs from the Seven Seas. The book was published on 14 October 2021 by Welbeck. It contains over 35 classic shanties and the stories around them, as well as new original shanties by Evans.

Discography

Albums

Singles

Music videos

Footnotes

References

External links
 Interview with Nathan Evans on Good Morning America

1994 births
Living people
Polydor Records artists
Royal Mail people
Scottish folk singers
Scottish baritones
Scottish people of Welsh descent
People from Airdrie, North Lanarkshire
21st-century Scottish male singers
Scottish pop singers
Scottish folk musicians
TikTokers